Tacca integrifolia, the white batflower or black lily, is a species of flowering plant in the yam family of Dioscoreaceae. It is native to tropical and subtropical rainforests of Asia. It was first described by the English botanist John Bellenden Ker Gawler in 1812.

Description
Tacca integrifolia is a herb growing from a thick, cylindrical rhizome. Its oblong-elliptical or lanceolate leaf blades are borne on long stems, some  including the petioles, with tapering bases and slender pointed tips.

Umbels 
Among the individual nodding flowers, which are arranged in an umbel, are further long, filiform (thread-like) bracts.

Distribution and habitat
The species is native to hilly regions of tropical and subtropical Asia. It is known from Pakistan, eastern India, Sri Lanka, Bhutan, Bangladesh, Nepal, Myanmar, Malaysia, Thailand, Cambodia, Vietnam and eastern China. It grows in the understorey of humid rainforests, growing in the leaf litter in shady sites.

Ecology
The stamens are attached to the tube of the perianth in a helmet-like manner and, with the flat-topped stigma lobes, may form an insect trap; a sweet musky odour has been detected from these flowers and this may attract flies as pollinators. After pollination, the scape bends over and the developing fruits rest on the ground. The fleshy fruits are a dull colour with soft jelly-like pulp, and it is possible that the seeds are dispersed by  rodents and other small mammals as they feed on the fruits.

References

External links

Dioscoreaceae
Root vegetables